Fire and Ice: The Winter War of Finland and Russia is a documentary film, produced, written and directed by Ben Strout. It shows how the Finnish–Russian Winter War of 1939 influenced World War II and how Finland mobilized against the world's largest military power.

A compelling witness in the documentary is Eeva Kilpi, the Finnish feminist writer, who was a child in Karelia at the time.

Release
Fire and Ice was shown on PBS stations around the U.S. circa February 2006. It has also been released on DVD.

Awards
The film was selected as the best documentary at the Minneapolis-St. Paul International Film Festival in 2006. Strout received an Emmy as director from the Lower Great Lakes Chapter of the National Academy of Television Arts and Sciences in 2007. In 2005 The New York Times named him as a Critic's Pick Director, and named editor Kurt Poole as Critic's Pick Editor.

References

External links
 http://www.wfyi.org/fireandice/ - official website
 http://www.mastersworkmedia.com - producer's website
 Finnish wartime photos and history website; includes stories by veterans, historians, and wartime pictures
 

Winter War in popular culture
2006 television films
2006 films
American documentary television films
2000s American films